Cambridge Parnells are a Gaelic football club in the city of Cambridge, England.

History 
The history of the club is a short one. The club was formed in April 2006 by students at the University of Cambridge. However, the club re-established Gaelic games in the city after the presence of Cambridge Harps, a team that competed up until the late 1980s. Underage teams came through in the 2010s and won county honours but the club is currently made up of just adult teams.

The team play in Coldham's Common in Cambridge.

Cambridge Parnells is the only GAA club in a large area of East Anglia, attracting players from the surrounding region and nearby cities and towns such as Norwich, Ipswich and Peterborough.

Honours 
 Hertfordshire Senior Football Championship — 2007, 2009
 Hertfordshire Senior Football League — 2007
 Cahill and Hurley Cup — 2007 (Hertfordshire GAA)
 U14 Hertfordshire League Winners - Dolan Cup - 2018
 U14 Hertfordshire Cup Winners - 2018

Website 
 Club website

Gaelic Athletic Association clubs established in 2006
Organisations based in Cambridge
Sport in Cambridge
Gaelic Athletic Association clubs in Britain
Gaelic football clubs in Britain
2006 establishments in England